Marko Vavic (born 25 April 1999) is an American water polo player. He competed in the 2020 Summer Olympics.

References

External links
 USC Trojans bio

1999 births
Living people
Sportspeople from Los Angeles
Water polo players at the 2020 Summer Olympics
American male water polo players
Olympic water polo players of the United States
USC Trojans men's water polo players
Pan American Games medalists in water polo
Pan American Games gold medalists for the United States
Water polo players at the 2019 Pan American Games
Medalists at the 2019 Pan American Games